Kevin "Chunky" Hayes (born 1983). He plays hurling with his local club Portumna and has been a member of the Galway senior inter-county team since 2005.

References

1984 births
Living people
Portumna hurlers
Galway inter-county hurlers
Connacht inter-provincial hurlers